The boyar hat (more correct Russian name is горлатная шапка, gorlatnaya hat) was a fur hat worn by Russian nobility between the 15th and 17th centuries, most notably by boyars, for whom it was a sign of their social status. The higher hat indicated the higher status.

In average, it was one ell in height, having the form of a cylinder with more broad upper part, velvet or  brocade top and the main body made of fox, marten or sable fur.

When taken off, the hat was often held above the forearm, between hand and elbow, or worn as a muff. When at home, the hats were preserved on wooden stands that were adorned with painted designs.

Today the hats of this type are sometimes used in the Russian fashion.

References

Киреева Е. В. «История костюма. Европейский костюм от античности до XX века.» Москва. Просвещение. 1976 / Kireeva E. V. The history of costume. European costume from Antiquity into the 20th century. Moscow, Prosvescheniye, 1976.

15th-century fashion
16th-century fashion
17th-century fashion
18th-century fashion
19th-century fashion
20th-century fashion
Hats
Russian clothing
Russian inventions
Fur